Sébastien Fidani (born 4 August 1978) is a French former professional footballer who played as a forward.

Career
Fidani started his football career with Nîmes and made his professional debut on 17 October 1996, coming on as a substitute and scoring late in a 3–1 home loss at Stade des Costières to AIK in the second round of the 1996–97 UEFA Cup Winners' Cup. The following years he would mainly play at a secondary level in France for Gazélec Ajaccio, Wasquehal, Sète and Martigues, before retiring from football in 2006 as part of Gallia Club Lunel.

References

1978 births
Living people
Association football forwards
Championnat National players
Championnat National 2 players
Championnat National 3 players
FC Martigues players
FC Sète 34 players
Footballers from Provence-Alpes-Côte d'Azur
France youth international footballers
French footballers
Gazélec Ajaccio players
Ligue 2 players
Nîmes Olympique players
People from Tarascon
Sportspeople from Bouches-du-Rhône
Wasquehal Football players